The  Indianapolis Colts season was the franchise's 59th season in the National Football League, the 28th in Indianapolis and the third (and last) under head coach Jim Caldwell. The Colts were coming off a 10–6 record in 2010 and a second consecutive AFC South championship, as well as a ninth consecutive playoff appearance.

The Colts had placed their franchise tag on star quarterback Peyton Manning before the season started but he sat out the entire season due to neck surgery. Also, Manning was never placed on injured reserve, but instead was on the Colts inactive list for each game. The Colts turned to retired quarterback Kerry Collins and then to Curtis Painter, neither of whom could fill Manning's void.
The Colts’ offense weakened rapidly in 2011. They were 30th in the league in yards gained (compared to 4th in 2010), 27th in passing yards (compared to 1st in 2010), 29th in receiving yards (compared to 2nd in 2010), 28th in scoring (compared to 4th in 2010), and 28th in total touchdowns (compared to 2nd in 2010). The Colts set a dubious NFL record on pass defense, by allowing 71.2% completed passes by opposing passers.

As early as the seventh week of the season, media discussion of whether the Colts might become the second team after the 2008 Lions to finish winless in a 16-game season began. With Stanford quarterback Andrew Luck regarded as a can’t miss franchise player in the upcoming draft, discussion of whether the Colts should aim to finish winless in order to be sure of drafting him emerged as the team’s losing streak continued and the Colts became even less competitive, with some critics comparing them to the 2008 Lions. The Colts finished the season with a 2–14 record, their worst record since 1991, and failed to make the playoffs for the first time since 2001.

On January 2, 2012, one day after the final game of the season, Colts owner Jim Irsay fired team Vice Chairman Bill Polian and his son, team Vice President and general manager Chris Polian. Irsay stated that the fate of head coach Jim Caldwell was still under review. On January 17, 2012, Irsay announced the firing of Caldwell as the head coach of the Colts. On March 7, 2012, Manning was released by the Colts. These moves marked the first major rebuilding of the team since the Polians joined.

Offseason

2011 draft board

 The Colts traded their seventh-round selection to the Washington Redskins in exchange for CB Justin Tryon.
 The Colts traded their second-round (fifty-fourth overall) selection and their fifth round (152nd overall) selection for the Jacksonville Jaguars’ second round (forty-ninth overall) selection.

Coaching staff

Final roster

Schedule

Preseason

Regular season
In addition to their regular games with AFC South division rivals, the Colts played games against the AFC North and NFC South according to the NFL’s schedule rotation, and also played games against the Patriots and the Chiefs based upon finishing positions from 2010.

Game summaries

Week 1: at Houston Texans

The Indianapolis Colts began their 2011 season at Reliant Stadium against the Houston Texans. For the first time since the 1998 season, Peyton Manning was not under the helm at quarterback and it was recently acquired Kerry Collins that would take his position. The game started very well for the Colts, opening up with an interception by Melvin Bullitt that allowed the Colts to take control.  However, a three and out from the offense quickly gave the Texans the ball to drive down and score a field goal and take a 3–0 lead.  Collins and the Colts offense was out of sync for much of the first quarter, fumbling two snaps and giving Houston the great field position inside of the Indianapolis 40-yard line.  After the first quarter, the Texans held a commanding 17–0 lead and were firing on all cylinders.  The second quarter continued Houston's dominance, with all three teams of the Colts failing to stop or to execute against the Texans.  At halftime, the Colts trailed Houston 34–0, the largest deficit in the entire 58-year history of the franchise.  The second half saw little action with both teams taking shorter drives and in some senses, running down the clock.  The Colts scored their first and the only points scored in the second half with a Reggie Wayne touchdown from Collins in the fourth quarter.  The Colts went on to lose to the Texans 34–7, their second straight season starting 0–1.

Week 2: vs. Cleveland Browns

The Indianapolis Colts had their 2011 home opener against the 0–1 Cleveland Browns.  The first quarter saw both teams getting into offensive and defensive rhythms and ended with the Colts holding only a 3–0 lead on an Adam Vinatieri field goal.  Heading to the second quarter, the Colts offense began to pick up behind Kerry Collins, rookie Delone Carter, and Joseph Addai.  However much of the success faded once Indianapolis reached the red zone, and were only able to come away with two field goals during the quarter.  Cleveland, however, was able to capitalize on the Colts defense, and saw a touchdown pass from Colt McCoy and a touchdown run from Peyton Hillis.  Cleveland went into halftime with a 14–9 lead.  The Indianapolis defense was able to stop Cleveland for most of the third quarter, and allowed the struggling offensive to close the gap with a fourth Vinatieri field goal, with Cleveland still holding a 14–12 lead into the fourth quarter.  Cleveland quickly drove down the field and started the quarter with a Phil Dawson field goal, allowing the Colts to remain in contention for the victory.  However, after turnovers and an inability to produce on offense, Cleveland broke the game open with a Hillis touchdown run, along with another Dawson field goal with 2:59 remaining in the game.  With Cleveland holding a 27–12 lead, Indianapolis was able to score their first touchdown of the game, allowing them to try an onside kick to preserve any chance of a comeback, which they were not able to convert.  Cleveland finished the game and the Colts by winning 27–19, their first victory over the Colts since 1994, and the Colts first 0–2 start since the 1998 season.

Week 3: vs. Pittsburgh Steelers

Hoping to rebound from their loss to the Cleveland Browns, the Indianapolis Colts remained at home for a week three intra-conference matchup with the Pittsburgh Steelers on Sunday night.  Indianapolis trailed early in the first quarter as Steelers kicker Shaun Suisham got a 48-yard field goal, followed by quarterback Ben Roethlisberger completing an 81-yard touchdown pass to wide receiver Mike Wallace.  The Colts would answer in the second quarter with a 21-yard field goal from kicker Adam Vinatieri, followed by defensive end Jamaal Anderson returning a fumble, forced by Dwight Freeney, 47 yards for a touchdown.  Another defensive turnover allowed the Colts and Vinatieri to score a 25-yard field goal, giving them a 13–10 lead at halftime.  After a scoreless third quarter, Pittsburgh took the lead in the fourth quarter with a Suisham 44-yard field goal, followed by safety Troy Polamalu returning a fumble 16 yards for a touchdown.  Indianapolis would tie the game again on running back Joseph Addai’s 6-yard touchdown run with 2:15 remaining in the game. However, the Steelers were able to capture the win with a final 38-yard field goal from Suisham, dropping the Colts to 0–3.

Week 4: at Tampa Bay Buccaneers

Hoping to rebound from their home loss to the Steelers, the Colts flew to Raymond James Stadium for a Week 4 Monday night duel with the Tampa Bay Buccaneers. With quarterback Kerry Collins recovering from concussion, quarterback Curtis Painter would make his first career start. Indianapolis delivered the game’s opening punch in the first quarter with a 45-yard field goal from kicker Adam Vinatieri. The Colts would add onto their lead in the second quarter with Painter finding wide receiver Pierre Garçon on an 87-yard touchdown pass, yet the Buccaneers answered with quarterback Josh Freeman getting a 1-yard touchdown run.  Tampa Bay would tie the game in the third quarter with kicker Connor Barth getting a 46-yard field goal, yet Indianapolis came right back with Painter hooking up Garçon again on a 59-yard touchdown pass. Afterwards, the Buccaneers tied the game with Freeman completing a 13-yard touchdown pass to wide receiver Preston Parker. Tampa Bay would take the lead in the fourth quarter with running back LeGarrette Blount getting a 35-yard touchdown run. From there, the defense prevented any comeback from the Colts’ offense. With the loss, the Colts dropped to 0–4.

Week 5: vs. Kansas City Chiefs

After dropping their first four games of the season, the Indianapolis Colts came back to Lucas Oil Stadium to take on the Kansas City Chiefs.  The game opened well for the Colts, who scored on their opening drive with a Curtis Painter to Pierre Garçon touchdown reception. In the second quarter, the Colts scored with an Adam Vinatieri field goal and another Painter to Garçon touchdown, giving Indianapolis a 17–0 lead midway through the second quarter.  A Kansas City touchdown pass from Matt Cassel ended the shutout but Indianapolis scored another touchdown later. A late Kansas City touchdown allowed the Colts to go into halftime with a 24–14 lead. Two touchdown passes from Cassel, to Dwayne Bowe and Steve Breaston respectively, gave the Chiefs 21 unanswered points and completed the comeback, winning the game 28–24, dropping the Colts to 0–5 on the season.

Week 6: at Cincinnati Bengals

With the Colts losing five consecutive games starting the 2011 season, Indianapolis looked to win their first game of the season against the Cincinnati Bengals.  Cincinnati opened up the game well, with a 1-yard touchdown run from Cedric Benson.  With both defenses performing well throughout the remainder of the first half with the only other scores coming on a Donald Brown touchdown run for the Colts, and a Mike Nugent field goal.  Going into halftime, the Bengals led the Colts 10–7.  Cincinnati dominated the third quarter on both fronts, with another Benson touchdown run and Nugent field goal, quickly running the lead up to 20–7 heading into the fourth quarter.  There Colts were able to strike on an Adam Vinatieri 46-yard field goal narrowing the score to 20–10.  A Dallas Clark touchdown reception from Curtis Painter allowed the Colts to cut the game to a 20–17 affair with 9:33 remaining in the fourth quarter.  After a missed Nugent field goal, with the Colts driving, Pierre Garçon fumbled the football, giving it to Carlos Dunlap who would take the ball in for a touchdown, and ended the score, with the Bengals winning the game 27–17, giving the Colts an 0–6 record on the season.

Week 7: at New Orleans Saints

In a rematch of Super Bowl XLIV on SNF, the Colts traveled to New Orleans to take on the Saints.  The Saints would quickly get on the board as Drew Brees would throw 3 touchdown passes in the quarter alone twice to Marques Colston from 14 and 4 yards out for 7–0 and 14–0 leads and once to Darren Sproles for a 21–0 lead.  They would eventually move ahead 31–0 in the 2nd quarter as Jed Collins ran for a 1-yard touchdown followed by John Kasay nailing a 23-yard field goal.  The Colts finally got on the board as Delone Carter ran for a touchdown from 2-yards out sending the game to 31–7.  Kasay would then kick a 47-yard field goal to send the Saints to a 34–7 lead at halftime.  In the 2nd half, the Saints score 4 consecutive touchdowns with Brees hooking up with Jimmy Graham on a 4-yard and 2-yard to increase their lead to 41–7 and then 48–7 in the 3rd quarter.  In the 4th quarter, Sproles ran for a 16-yard touchdown while Leigh Torrence returned an interception 42 yards for a touchdown for score of 55–7 and then the final score would be 62–7.

The Colts’ loss was the most lopsided game of the 2011 NFL season and the first time a team had allowed 60 or more points since January 2000, when the Jacksonville Jaguars humiliated the Miami Dolphins 62–7 in the divisional round playoffs. It was also the worst loss in franchise history in terms of margin (55) and points allowed (62).

The Colts would go on and drop even further down to 0–7.

Week 8: at Tennessee Titans

After a huge loss at the Saints, the Colts traveled to Nashville take on the Titans.  The Titans would score 20 unanswered points in the first half alone as Rob Bironas would kick a 51-yard field goal for a 3–0 lead in the first quarter, and in the 2nd quarter, Jason McCourty would recover a blocked punt in the end zone sending the game to 10–0, followed up by Bironas nailing a 50-yard field goal for 13–0 and eventual halftime lead of 20–0 when Nate Washington ran for a 3-yard touchdown.  The Colts would manage to get on the board as Adam Vinatieri would kick a 22-yard field goal for a 20–3 lead.  Donald Brown managed to increase his team's points with a 4-yard touchdown run for a 20–10 lead.  The Titans however wrapped the game up when Washington ran for a 14-yard touchdown for a final score of 27–10.
With the loss, the Colts fell to 0–8.

Week 9: vs. Atlanta Falcons

After 2 straight losses on the road, the Colts returned home to take on the Falcons.  The Falcons dominated scoring 21 unanswered points as Michael Turner would run for a 1-yard touchdown for a 7–0 lead.  It was then followed up by Matt Ryan finding Julio Jones on a 50-yard touchdown pass taking the game to 14–0 in the first quarter.  In the 2nd quarter, Ryan and Jones hooked up again on an 80-yard pass sending the game to 21–0.  The Colts finally got on the board as Jerraud Powers returned an interception 6-yards for a touchdown making the halftime lead 21–7.  In the 3rd quarter, Ryan hooked up with Tony Gonzalez for a 1-yard pass making the score 28–7.  In the 4th quarter, Matt Bryant would kick a 20-yard field goal to send his team for a final score of 31–7.

With the loss, the Colts then fell to 0–9 giving them their first losing season since 2001. With the Dolphins’ win over the Chiefs that same week, the Colts became the league's only team without a win.

Week 10: vs. Jacksonville Jaguars

The Colts stayed home and took on the Jaguars.  The Jags would manage to score early in the 1st quarter as Josh Scobee would kick a 44-yard field goal for a 3–0 lead.  In the 2nd quarter, the Colts would get on the board as Adam Vinatieri would tie the game for his team 3–3 with a 42-yard field goal.  This would eventually be the halftime score.  Once again, the Colts found themselves being overpowered in the 2nd half of a game as Blaine Gabbert hooked up with Jarett Dillard on an 11-yard touchdown pass to send the game to a 10–3 score in the 3rd quarter followed up by Maurice Jones-Drew running for a 3-yard touchdown to make the final score 17–3.

With the loss, the Colts entered their bye week at 0–10.

Week 12: vs. Carolina Panthers

After a good rest on their bye week, the Colts stayed home for a game against the Panthers. In the first quarter the Panthers jumped into an early lead as Olindo Mare kicked a 30-yard field goal for a leading score of 3–0.  They would make it 10–0 in the 2nd quarter when Cam Newton ran for a touchdown from 14 yards out.  The Colts got on the board when Donald Brown ran for a 17-yard touchdown coming within 3, 10–7.  Followed by an Adam Vinatieri field goal from 43 yards out tying the game at halftime 10–10.  In the 3rd quarter, the Panthers moved back into the lead as De'Angelo Williams ran for a touchdown from 25-yards out taking a 17–10 lead.  The Colts came within 4 points as Vinatieri kicked a 30-yard field goal for a 17–13 game.  In the 4th quarter, the Panthers moved ahead by double digits as Williams ran for a 2-yard touchdown for a 24–13 game.  Though the Colts managed to move within 5 points as Curtis Painter found Reggie Wayne on a 56-yard pass (with a failed 2-point conversion) for a 24–19 game.  The Panthers managed to wrap the game up when Mare kicked a 41-yard field goal taking the final score to 27–19.

With the loss, the Colts dropped down to 0–11.

Week 13: at New England Patriots

Despite putting up 21 points in the fourth quarter with Dan Orlovsky under center, the Colts again lost on the road to the New England Patriots.

With the loss, the Colts fell to 0–12 and became the ninth team in NFL history to start 0–12, and the third franchise after the Lions and Buccaneers to suffer this ignominy twice.

Week 14: at Baltimore Ravens

With this loss, the Colts fell to 0–13 and became the sixth team in NFL history to start a season at 0–13, and the first franchise to suffer this ignominy on multiple occasions.

Week 15: vs. Tennessee Titans

After starting 0–13 and looking most likely to become the second team in NFL history to go 0–16 after the 2008 Detroit Lions, the Colts finally won a game. Having a career day, Donald Brown and a strong defense would deny Tennessee any hope of a win as the team improved to 1–13, allowing them to avoid becoming the third team in post-merger NFL history to finish a season winless, after the 2008 Lions and the 1976 Tampa Bay Buccaneers. The victory also ended the possibility of the 2011 season becoming the first in NFL history to feature both an undefeated and winless team in one season, as the Green Bay Packers lost to the Kansas City Chiefs after a 13–0 start the same day.

Week 16: vs. Houston Texans

With the win, the Colts improved to 2–13 and retained their perfect 10–0 record against the Texans at home.

Week 17: at Jacksonville Jaguars

With the loss, the Colts finished the season at 2–14 and were swept by the Jaguars for the first time in franchise history. They became the first division rival to sweep the Colts since the Tennessee Titans did so in 2002. This was the first season ever when the Jaguars swept the Colts as division rivals, and became the only team to do so this season after the Colts gained their only two wins for the season at home against the Texans (who were 0–10 in Indianapolis by 2011) and Titans.

Since the NFL moved to a sixteen-game season in 1978, the Colts had now suffered the most seasons with three or fewer wins (six in 1981, 1986, 1991, 1997, 1998 and 2011, plus a winless strike-shortened season in 1982) of any NFL franchise. The Colts also had the worst record of any AFC team since the Kansas City Chiefs in 2008.

With this final loss, the Colts ended their 2011 season tied with the St. Louis Rams for the worst record in the NFL, thereby earning the right to the first overall pick in the 2012 NFL Draft due to a tiebreaker. This pick is the highest draft pick the Colts had had since 1998, when they selected Peyton Manning with the first overall pick, and the fourth time the Indianapolis-era Colts had the first overall pick.

Standings

Conference standings

Notes

References

Indianapolis
Indianapolis Colts seasons
Colt